The National Assembly was the legislature of the Second Philippine Republic from September 25, 1943, to February 2, 1944.

Half of the membership of the assembly consisted of provincial governors or city mayors acting in an ex officio capacity, while the other half were indirectly elected through local conventions of KALIBAPI members during the Japanese occupation of the Philippines.

Legislation
The National Assembly of the Second Philippine Republic passed a total of 66 laws: Act No. 1 to 66.

Major legislation
Act No. 1 – Creation of the Ministry of Foreign Affairs

Leadership

President
President of the Second Philippine Republic:
José P. Laurel (KALIBAPI)

National Assembly
Speaker:
Benigno S. Aquino (KALIBAPI, Tarlac)

Floor Leader:
Francisco Zulueta (KALIBAPI, Bacolod)

Members

The assembly consisted of 108 members from 46 provinces and 8 chartered cities. The numbers and territorial coverages of these areas differed from the pre-war status in several ways:
 The provinces of Batanes, Marinduque and Romblon had been abolished and their municipalities annexed to Cagayan, Tayabas and Capiz respectively by virtue of Executive Order No. 84 issued by Philippine Executive Commission Chairman Jorge Vargas on August 31, 1942. 
 Jurisdiction over several areas in Tayabas were transferred to Nueva Ecija (the municipalities of Baler and Casiguran; corresponding to the entire present-day territory of Aurora) and Laguna (Infanta, including the present-day municipalities of General Nakar and Real) by virtue of Executive Order No. 84 issued by Executive Commission Chairman Jorge Vargas on August 31, 1942. 
 Jurisdiction over the Polillo Islands in Tayabas was transferred to Laguna by virtue of Executive Order No. 103 issued by Executive Commission Chairman Jorge Vargas on November 1, 1942. 
 The chartered cities of Dansalan (now Marawi), Tagaytay and Zamboanga were also not represented separately in the assembly; their territories were administered by the governments of their mother provinces Lanao, Cavite and Zamboanga, respectively. 
 The representation of Manila also included the chartered city of Quezon City, along with the Rizal municipalities of Caloocan, Makati, Mandaluyong, Parañaque, Pasay and San Juan, which were constituted as the City of Greater Manila by Manuel Quezon's Executive Act No. 400 on January 1, 1942, as an emergency wartime measure.

Note: List is according to the National Assembly Yearbook 1943 and the Official program of the inauguration of the Republic of the Philippines and the induction into office of His Excellency Jose P. Laurel. The names in italics are ex officio members (i.e., city mayors or provincial governors).

See also
National Assembly of the Philippines
1943 Philippine general election

References

Further reading
Philippine House of Representatives Congressional Library

Second Philippine Republic
Historical legislatures in the Philippines